Maurice (stylized as Måurice) is a restaurant in Portland, Oregon.

Description
The bakery and restaurant has been described as a "French-Scandinavian" and "French-Nordic" luncheonette. The menu includes goat-filled bisteeya (meat pies) and polenta clafouti with confit chicken heart. Dessert options include black pepper cheesecake, creme brulee pops, and rhubarb and celery leaf cheese.

History
Kristen Murray opened in the restaurant in December 2013. She raised $40,000 via Kickstarter to support the launch. Murray launched a regular prix-fixe brunch in 2014, and Sunday brunch in 2018.

Reception

In 2014, the Portland Mercury Andrea Damewood wrote, "This isn't your fattyboombatty Cheesecake Factory fare." The Oregonian Michael Russell rated the restaurant 2.5 out of 3 stars. Maurice was included in Bon Appetit "America's Best New Restaurants 2014" list, and ranked number 9 in the magazine's "Hot 10" list. In 2017, food critic Ruth Reichl called Maurice "the quintessential Portland restaurant".

Murray was nominated in the Best Chef: Northwest and Pacific category of the 2020 James Beard Awards for her work at Maurice. Michelle Lopez and Brooke Jackson-Glidden included the restaurant in Eater Portland 2021 list of "Outstanding Bakeries in Portland and Beyond". Alex Frane and Jackson-Glidden also included Maurice in the website's 2021 list of "11 Charming French Restaurants in Portland". Jackson-Glidden also included the restaurant in the site's 2021 list of "The 38 Essential Restaurants and Food Carts in Portland". The business was included in Eater Portland's 2022 overview of "Where to Eat and Drink in Downtown Portland".

See also

 List of French restaurants
 List of Scandinavian restaurants

References

External links

 

2013 establishments in Oregon
French restaurants in Portland, Oregon
Restaurants established in 2013
Scandinavian restaurants in the United States
Southwest Portland, Oregon